John "Jimmy" Dale (1870–1948) was an English footballer, who played for Stoke and Southampton St Mary's in the 1890s.

Football career
Dale was born in Audley, Staffordshire, and started his football career  with Sunderland in January 1893. He failed to break into Sunderland's first-team and returned to Staffordshire to join Stoke of the Football League First Division in June 1894.

At Stoke, he made four League appearances all of which came during the first month of the 1894–95 season before moving to the south coast to join Southampton St Mary's of the Southern League in October 1895, following several players, including Jack Farrell, Willie Naughton and Samuel Meston, who had moved in the summer together with Stoke's trainer, Bill Dawson.

He made his debut for the "Saints" on 19 October 1895, taking the place of Ernie Taylor at right-half for the visit of Clapton to the Antelope Ground. The match ended in a 7–3 "thrashing" by Clapton and after two further league matches and two in the FA Cup, Dale returned to Staffordshire, where he played for his local club, Audley Town, and worked in the coal mines.

Career statistics
Source:

Notes
  Some older sources show that Dale was born in  Motherwell, Scotland in  July 1869.

References

1870 births
1948 deaths
Footballers from Staffordshire
English footballers
Association football defenders
Stoke City F.C. players
Sunderland A.F.C. players
Southampton F.C. players
English Football League players
Southern Football League players